Émile André Jean-Marie Maury (22 May 1907 – 5 January 1994), sometimes called Jean-Marie Maury or Jean Baptiste Maury, was a French prelate of the Catholic Church who worked in the diplomatic service of the Holy See and was Archbishop of Reims from 1968 to 1972.

Biography
Maury was born on 22 May 1907 in Agen and ordained a priest on 29 June 1932.

He was appointed coadjutor bishop of Tarbes and Lourdes and titular bishop of Elis on 20 December 1957. He was consecrated bishop on 3 February 1958 by Cardinal Pierre-Marie Gerlier.

On 9 July 1959, he was appointed Titular Archbishop of Laodicea in Phrygia and was named apostolic delegate to Dakar, a jurisdiction established in 1948 with responsibility for French colonial Africa. The position was rechristened Apostolic Delegate to Western African on 23 September 1960 and given responsibility for Senegal, Upper Volta, Cote d'Ivoire, Dahomey, Guinea, Mauritania, Niger, Sudan, Togo, Ghana, Gambia, and Sierra Leone. On 28 December 1961 his status with respect to one of those countries changed when he was named Apostolic Internuncio to Senegal. 

He was given new assignments in 1965: as Apostolic Nuncio to the Democratic Republic of the Congo on 11 June, to Burundi on 16 June, and to Rwanda on 2 September.

In 1967, he renounced the last two nunciatures, continuing as Nuncio to the Congo until he left the diplomatic service the next year.

On 25 June 1968, he was appointed Archbishop of Reims. He retired on 16 December 1972 for health reasons. 

He died on 5 January 1994.

References

External links
Catholic Hierarchy: Archbishop Jean Émile André Marie Maury

1907 births
1994 deaths
People from Agen
Apostolic Nuncios to Senegal
Apostolic Nuncios to the Democratic Republic of the Congo
Apostolic Nuncios to Rwanda
Apostolic Nuncios to Burundi
Archbishops of Reims
20th-century Roman Catholic archbishops in France